Pentire (12 April 1992 – 20 November 2017) was a British Thoroughbred racehorse and sire.

Background
Pentire was bred by Lord Halifax, he was purchased for 54,000 guineas by Mollers Racing, the racing stable Trust of brothers Eric and Budgie Moller.

Racing career
Trained by Geoff Wragg, at age two Pentire's best result in a conditions race was a third in the Richmond Stakes. At age three in 1995, the colt had an outstanding year that included twice beating the brilliant runner, Singspiel. Pentire made seven starts, winning six and earning a strong second to Lammtarra in Britain's most prestigious all-age race, the Group one King George VI and Queen Elizabeth Diamond Stakes. In 1996, Pentire came back to a dominating win in the King George VI and Queen Elizabeth Diamond Stakes and earned a Timeform rating of 132 for the second straight year. On 6 October Pentire ran tenth to winner Helissio in the 1996 Prix de l'Arc de Triomphe in Paris and then in what would be his final race, finished eighth to Singspiel in the Japan Cup in Tokyo.

Stud career
Purchased for breeding purposes by Teruya Yoshida, owner of one of  Japan's preeminent breeding operations, Shadai Farm, Pentire was retired to stud in 1997 at his owner's farm and also stood that year in New Zealand.

In 2004 he was sent to a breeding operation in Germany.

From 2005, Pentire was the foundation sire at Rich Hill Stud, Walton, New Zealand.

He sired over 300 winners and 25 stakes winners. His most notable progeny include the New Zealand gallopers:

 Mufhasa:, 2011 winner of the 2009 and 2011 Telegraph Handicap and Waikato Sprint, 2010 Otaki-Maori Weight for Age, 2011 Makfi Challenge Stakes, Toorak Handicap, Captain Cook Stakes, 2012 Futurity Stakes (MRC) and Windsor Park Plate.  New Zealand Horse of the Year in 2009 and 2011.
 Penny Gem: winner of the 2003 Captain Cook Stakes.
 Prince of Penzance: winner of the 2014 Moonee Valley Cup and 2015 Melbourne Cup.
 Xcellent: winner of the 2004 New Zealand Derby, 2005 Kelt Capital Stakes, New Zealand Stakes and Mudgway Stakes.  New Zealand Horse of the Year in 2005 and 2006.
 Xtravagant.

Death
On 20 November 2017 Pentire died aged 25 at Rich Hill Stud in Waikato, New Zealand as a result of an internal tumour.

Pedigree

References

1992 racehorse births
2017 racehorse deaths
Racehorses bred in Kentucky
Racehorses trained in the United Kingdom
Thoroughbred family 1-l
King George VI and Queen Elizabeth Stakes winners
New Zealand Thoroughbred sires